Trail of the Mounties, also known as Law of the Mounties, is a 1947 American Western film directed by Howard Bretherton and starring Russell Hayden, Jennifer Holt, and Emmett Lynn.

Premise
A Royal Canadian Mounted Policeman is seeking to thwart a gang of fur thieves led by his twin brother Johnny.

Cast
 Russell Hayden as Sandy/ Johnny Sanderson
 Jennifer Holt as Kathie McBain
 Emmett Lynn as Gumdrop
 Terry Frost as Nick
 Harry Cording as Hawkins
 Charles Bedell as Maurice
 Zon Murray as Jacques

References

External links
 
Trail of the Mounties at TCMDB

1947 films
1947 Western (genre) films
American Western (genre) films
American black-and-white films
Films scored by Albert Glasser
Films set in Canada
Royal Canadian Mounted Police in fiction
Lippert Pictures films
Films directed by Howard Bretherton
1940s English-language films
1940s American films